Babatunde Omoroga Adebimpe  (born February 26, 1975) is an American musician, singer-songwriter, actor, director, and visual artist best known as the lead singer of the Brooklyn-based band TV on the Radio.

Early life
Adebimpe was born into a Nigerian immigrant family in the United States. Babatunde is a Yoruba name that means "father has returned". He attended Shady Side Academy in Fox Chapel, Pennsylvania for high school, where he is still active on the board. His deceased father was a psychiatrist in Pittsburgh. He is married to French cartoonist Domitille Collardey, with whom he has a son.

Film and television career
In 1998, Adebimpe worked as one of the initial animators of MTV's hyper-violent claymation program Celebrity Deathmatch.

He starred in a 2001 indie movie, Jump Tomorrow, based on a short college film, Jorge, in which he played the same character.

In 2003, Adebimpe directed the music video for the Yeah Yeah Yeahs song "Pin".

In 2008, he appeared as the groom in Jonathan Demme's Rachel Getting Married alongside Rosemarie DeWitt, who portrayed his character's bride, and Anne Hathaway, who portrayed the bride's wayward sister. In the film, Adebimpe performs an a cappella cover of the Neil Young song "Unknown Legend".

In 2011, Adebimpe directed the visual companion to the band's fourth album, Nine Types of Light. For the film, he recruited a roster of the band's favorite filmmakers to helm individual clips that would be sewn together into an abstract narrative about dreams, love, fame and the future. Adebimpe directed the video for the song "Forgotten", as well as the interstitial clips where a chorus of narrators help try to connect the dots between the film's various segments.

In 2013, Adebimpe directed and animated the video for Higgins Waterproof Black Magic Band's single "The Blast the Bloom", In late 2013, Adebimpe wrapped shooting on Chilean director Sebastian Silva's Nasty Baby, starring opposite Kristen Wiig and director Silva. The film was released in 2015.

Adebimpe made a brief cameo as himself on the IFC program Portlandia in the show's season 4 premiere.

In 2016, he provided the voice for the character Banana Guard #16 in the Adventure Time episode "The Thin Yellow Line".

In 2017, he starred in the second season of The Girlfriend Experience.

Adebimpe portrayed Mr. Cobbwell in Spider-Man: Homecoming (2017).

In 2020,  in the second episode of the HBO Perry Mason miniseries, Adebimpe has a small role as a street preacher.

Adebimpe will have a recurring role in the upcoming HBO drama series The Idol.

Music career

TV on the Radio

Solo work and collaborations
As well as occasionally performing solo, Adebimpe regularly collaborates with other musicians. He provides backing vocals on the track "Dragon Queen" on the Yeah Yeah Yeahs' 2009 record, It's Blitz!, which was produced by fellow TV on the Radio member David Andrew Sitek. He appears on several tracks of Dragons of Zynth's Coronation Thieves, also partially produced by Sitek. He produced and guested on "Your Glasshouse", a track from Atmosphere's 2008 record When Life Gives You Lemons, You Paint That Shit Gold. He is featured on the song "Deathful" on Subtle's album Yell&Ice.

In early 2009, he performed three shows as a duo with Tall Firs drummer Ryan Sawyer, the latter two under the name Stabbing Eastward. Also in early 2009, Adebimpe released a combined single/DVD under the name Fake Male Voice on the Japan/Brooklyn label Heartfast. He performed one show under that name with a pickup group at the record's release party. Fake Male Voice again performed at a Heartfast showcase during CMJ 2009, as a duo comprising Adebimpe and Gerard Smith.

In 2009 Adebimpe collaborated with Massive Attack on the track "Pray for Rain".

In 2010, Adebimpe was featured on his TV on the Radio bandmate Dave Sitek's project Maximum Balloon on the track "Absence of Light".

Adebimpe with members of TV on the Radio are featured on three tracks from Tinariwen's album Tassili (2011), and on the Amadou & Mariam track "Wily Kataso", from the 2012 album Folila. Ian Brennan was a producer on the record, which went on to win a Grammy.

In 2012, Adebimpe formed the band Higgins Waterproof Black Magic Band, who released their self-titled EP on their own ZNA records in October 2013.

Adebimpe provided the vocals on Bad Radio, a track on Leftfield's Alternative Light Source album in 2015.

He is a member of the group Nevermen with Mike Patton and Doseone. Their debut album Nevermen  was released in 2016.

Adebimpe provided the vocals on "Thieves! (Screamed The Ghosts)" on Run The Jewels' album Run the Jewels 3 in 2017.

Adebimpe collaborated with Rockstar Games and released Speedline Miracle Masterpiece (ft. Sal P. & Sinkane) as part of the Welcome to Los Santos soundtrack for Grand Theft Auto V. The song was also used for the trailer music for the Further Adventures in Finance and Felony DLC.

In October 2022, he contributed a cover of Sleater-Kinney's "The Drama You’ve Been Craving" for Dig Me In: A Dig Me Out Covers Album, a tribute compilation in occasion of the twenty-fifth anniversary of Dig Me Out. Pitchfork called the track a "high point", describing Adebimpe's rendition as "barely recognizable, swapping its frenetic spunk for sultry synth-pop".

Visual art
Originally a cartoonist, Adebimpe still maintains a design, drawing and painting practice. In addition to art directing all of TV on the Radio's album covers, he painted the cover for the band's 2013 single "Mercy".

In 2009, Adebimpe released a self-published art comic, Plague Hero. The painted book depicts a boxing match between two anthropomorphic characters. Randomly selected copies contained a DVD of "Mystery Sh*t", a compilation of song sketches and animations from Adebimpe's archives.

In May 2017, Adebimpe premiered A Warm Weather Ghost, a live, multimedia performance work commissioned by the Walker Art Center, in Minneapolis.

Filmography

Film

Television

References

External links
 
 

1975 births
Living people
American rock singers
Musicians from Pittsburgh
American male film actors
21st-century American male actors
21st-century American musicians
Animators from Pennsylvania
Stop motion animators
Clay animators
American animated film directors
American music video directors
Male actors from St. Louis
American people of Yoruba descent
Yoruba male actors
Yoruba musicians
American people of Nigerian descent
Singers from Pennsylvania
Shady Side Academy alumni
21st-century American male singers
21st-century American singers
African-American rock singers
21st-century African-American male singers
20th-century African-American people